Ouvrage Laudrefang is a lesser work (petit ouvrage) of the Maginot Line.  Located in the Fortified Sector of Faulquemont, the ouvrage consists of one infantry block, and is located between petits ouvrages Einseling and Teting, facing Germany.  Laudrefang was originally planned as a gros ouvrage. With a heavy armament for a petit ouvrage it successfully defended its neighbors against German attack during the Battle of France. Laudrefang is abandoned and flooded, and was heavily damaged by German bombardment in 1940.

Design and construction 
The site was surveyed by CORF (Commission d'Organisation des Régions Fortifiées), the Maginot Line's design and construction agency, and was approved for construction in August 1931. It was completed at a cost of 24 million francs by the contractor Générale des Travaux Publics. The petit ouvrage was originally planned as a gros ouvrage with fourteen blocks The project was scaled back, and Block 3 was not connected to the main ouvrage. A second phase was to connect it, and to provide a separate entrance block. Even as a petit ouvrage it mounted the heaviest armament in its sector, with 81mm mortars.

Description 
Laudrefang comprises five infantry blocks. Blocks 1, 2 4 and 5 are linked by deep underground galleries, which also provide space for barracks, utilities and ammunition storage.
Block 1: Infantry block with two automatic rifle cloches (GFM), one twin machine gun embrasure (JM), two 81mm mortar embrasures and one machine gun/anti-tank gun embrasure (JM/AC47). The two-level block was heavily damaged by German shellfire.
Block 2: Infantry block with two GFM cloches and one retractable twin machine gun turret.
Block 3: Infantry block with two GFM cloches, one retractable twin machine gun turret, one twin machine gun embrasure, two 81mm mortar embrasures and one JM/AC47 anti-tank gun embrasure. The mortars are on a lower level, firing out of the ditch in front of the embrasures.
Block 4: Infantry/emergency exit block with two GFM cloches and one grenade launcher cloche (LG).
Block 5: Infantry block with one GFM cloche and one observation cloche (VDP). The block and cloches show the marks of German attack.

The unbuilt blocks of the gros ouvrage would have included  separate personnel and munitions entries, two 75mm gun turrets and a 135mm gun turret.

Casemates and shelters 
In addition to the connected combat blocks, a series of detached casemates and infantry shelters surround Laudrefang, including
 Casemate des Quatre-Vents Nord: Armored block with one mortar cloche and one mortar cloche modified to AM standard.
 Casemate des Quatre-Vents Sud: SIngle block with one JM/AC47 embrasure, one JM embrasure, one GFM-A cloche and one GFM-A/B cloche.

Manning 
The 1940 manning of the ouvrage under the command of Captain Gustave Cattiaux comprised 267 men and 8 officers of the 156th Fortress Infantry Regiment. The units were under the umbrella of both the 3rd and 4th Armies, Army Group 2. The Casernement de Zimming provided peacetime above-ground barracks and support services to Laudrefang and other positions in the area.

History 
See Fortified Sector of Faulquemont for a broader discussion of the Faulquemont sector of the Maginot Line.

Following the 15 June 1940 breakthrough by German forces through the Saar gap, the Germans advanced along the rear of the Maginot Line.  The German 167th Infantry Division approached Kerfent, Bambesch, Einseling  and Téting on 19 June. On 21 June 1940 Laudrefang supported neighboring ouvrages Einseling and Teting as they came under attack with an estimated 5000 81mm mortar rounds. The covering fire prevented the Germans from taking either. The German infantry attacks were suspended in favor of an artillery barrage at Laudrefang, firing between 3000 and 3500 rounds at the ouvrage. Compared to other German attacks on other ouvrages, the bombardment of Laudrefang was relatively ineffectual.  While the concrete structure was badly damaged, it was not perforated, and the mortar turrets and cloches were not hit. The ouvrage survived until the Second Armistice at Compiègne took effect on 25 June, when it surrendered. The machine gun turret at Block 3 was used for testing of shaped-charge munitions.

After World War II, Laudrefang was in poor condition and was not chosen for renovation.

Current condition 
The lower levels of Laudrefang are flooded by groundwater, and the entire ouvrage is abandoned.

See also 
 List of all works on Maginot Line
 Siegfried Line
 Atlantic Wall
 Czechoslovak border fortifications

Notes

References

Bibliography 
Allcorn, William. The Maginot Line 1928-45. Oxford: Osprey Publishing, 2003. 
Kaufmann, J.E. and Kaufmann, H.W. Fortress France: The Maginot Line and French Defenses in World War II, Stackpole Books, 2006. 
Kaufmann, J.E., Kaufmann, H.W., Jancovič-Potočnik, A. and Lang, P. The Maginot Line: History and Guide, Pen and Sword, 2011. 
Mary, Jean-Yves; Hohnadel, Alain; Sicard, Jacques. Hommes et Ouvrages de la Ligne Maginot, Tome 1. Paris, Histoire & Collections, 2001.  
Mary, Jean-Yves; Hohnadel, Alain; Sicard, Jacques. Hommes et Ouvrages de la Ligne Maginot, Tome 2. Paris, Histoire & Collections, 2003.  
Mary, Jean-Yves; Hohnadel, Alain; Sicard, Jacques. Hommes et Ouvrages de la Ligne Maginot, Tome 3. Paris, Histoire & Collections, 2003.  
Mary, Jean-Yves; Hohnadel, Alain; Sicard, Jacques. Hommes et Ouvrages de la Ligne Maginot, Tome 5. Paris, Histoire & Collections, 2009.

External links
 Association de Sauvegarde des Petits Ouvrages de Laudrefang et Téting 
 L'ouvrage du Laudrefang at alsacemaginot.com 
 ouvrage de Laudrefang at lignemaginot.com 
 Laudrefang (petit ouvrage A37 de) at fortiff.be 
 L'ouvrage de Laudrefang at wikimaginot.eu 

LAUD
Maginot Line